(December 24, 1920 – August 3, 2015) was a Japanese author. He was known for his fiction centered on World War II, as well as his biographies and essays.

Literary career 
Agawa was born in Hiroshima, Japan. As a high school student Agawa was influenced by the Japanese author Naoya Shiga. He entered the Tokyo Imperial University to study Japanese literature. Upon graduation in 1942, Agawa was conscripted to serve in the Imperial Japanese Navy, where he worked as an intelligence officer breaking Chinese military codes until the end of the war. He returned to Hiroshima, where his parents had experienced the atomic bomb, in March 1946.

After World War II Agawa wrote his first short story Nennen Saisai (Years upon Years, 1946), which was a classic I Novel, or autobiographical novel, recounting the reunion with his parents. It follows the style of Naoya Shiga, who is said to have praised the work. August 6 as Agawa notes in a postscript, combines the stories of friends and acquaintances who experienced the bombing into the testimony of one family. Occupation censorship at the time was strict, but the story passed because, the author later observed, "it made no reference to the problems of after-effect and continued no overt criticism of the U.S." Agawa came to popular and critical attention with his Citadel in Spring (1952), which was awarded the Yomiuri Prize. (He later revisited the same theme of his experiences as a student soldier in Kurai hato (Dark waves, 1974)). Ma no isan (Devil's Heritage, 1953), a documentary novel, is an account of the bombing of Hiroshima through the eyes of a young Tokyo reporter, handling, among other topics, the death of his Hiroshima nephew and survivors' reactions to the Atomic bomb Casualty Commission, the U.S. agency that conducted research on atomic victims.

Agawa's four major biographical novels are Yamamoto Isoroku (山本五十六, 1965), Yonai Mitsumasa (米内光政, 1978), Inoue Seibi (井上成美, 1986), and Shiga Naoya (志賀直哉, 1994). His other major works include Kumo no bohyo (Grave markers in the clouds, 1955), and Gunkan Nagato no shogai (The life of the warship Nagato, 1975).

Agawa was awarded the Order of Culture (Bunka Kunsho) in 1999.

He is the father of Sawako Agawa, popular author and TV personality, and Naoyuki Agawa, professor of law at Keio University.

Bibliography

Prizes 
 1952 Yomiuri Prize - Citadel in Spring, (Haru no shiro,)
 1966 Shincho Literary Prize - The Reluctant Admiral (Yamamoto Isoroku,)
 1987 Nippon Grand Literary Prize - Inoue Seibi (「井上成美」)
 1994 Noma Literary Prize - Shiga Naoya (「志賀直哉」)
 2002 Yomiuri Prize - Shokumi-Buburoku (「食味風々録」)
 2007　Kikuchi Kan Prize

Notes

Sources 
 J'Lit | Authors : Hiroyuki Agawa | Books from Japan 
 Contemporary Authors Online, Gale, 2002
 Burial in the Clouds, Tuttle Pub. info
 Atomic Bomb Literature: A Bibliography
 JSTOR, Citadel in Spring review

1920 births
Imperial Japanese Navy officers
20th-century Japanese novelists
21st-century Japanese novelists
2015 deaths
Yomiuri Prize winners
Recipients of the Order of Culture
Writers from Hiroshima
University of Tokyo alumni
War writers
Imperial Japanese Navy personnel of World War II